The "Letter of Seventeen" was a wildly unpopular open letter to the exiled Crimean Tatar community in published in Lenin Bayrağı in March 1968 condemning desire for right of return. Crimean Tatar civil rights activist Yuri Osmanov referred to it as the "letter of national traitors". The condescending letter opened with downplaying their major struggles and discrimination in Asia, urging their fellow Crimean Tatars to accept the situation and take root in Central Asia rather than supporting the right of return to Crimea that many Crimean Tatars dreamed of. In the middle, it claimed the September 1967 "rehabilitation" decree "radically solved their national question"; however, in reality, the widely despised decree, which initially confused some Crimean Tatars into thinking they were allowed to return to Crimea, only for them to be deported again, merely labeled Crimean Tatars as rehabilitated on paper without right to reparations or return and in addition to normalizing use of the despised terminology of "citizens of Tatar nationality who formerly lived in the Crimea" instead of the proper ethnonym of "Crimean Tatar". At the end, it painted return to Crimea as a romantic desire that one should suppress for the greater good and was subsequently co-signed by 17 relatively accomplished but not widely known members of the community who towed the party line and did not publicly desire right of return. After Crimean Tatars were allowed right of return to Crimea decades later, the letter was republished in Avdet on 15 March 1991 with commentary discouraging people from betraying their people in dire times like the signers of the letter did.

Signatories 

 Seit Izmailov
 Seit Tairov
 Mustafa Cholakov
 Mustafa Chachi
 Shevket Atamanov
 Anife Alchikova
 Abduraim Appazov
 Yagya Avlyakimov
 Liban Appazov
 Akhtem Mustafaev
 Kurt Sametdinov
 Riza Memetov
 Gulver Asanov
 Shevket Kadyrov
 Meryem Kovaleva
 Isa Azizov
 Memet Molochnikov

See also
 Mubarek zone

References

External links 

 Text of the Letter (in Russian)

Politics of the Crimean Tatars
Uzbek Soviet Socialist Republic
1968 in the Soviet Union